Stoenești is a commune in Argeș County, Muntenia, Romania. It is composed of seven villages: Bădeni, Cotenești, Lunca Gârtii, Piatra, Slobozia, Stoenești and Valea Bădenilor.

References

Communes in Argeș County
Localities in Muntenia